The Commissioners for the Victualling of the Navy, often called the Victualling Commissioners or Victualling Board, was the body responsible under the Navy Board for victualling ships of the British Royal Navy. It oversaw the vast operation of providing naval personnel (140,000 men in 1810) with enough food, drink and supplies to keep them fighting fit, sometimes for months at a time, in whatever part of the globe they might be stationed.
It existed from 1683 until 1832 when its function was first replaced by the Department of the Comptroller of Victualling and Transport Services until 1869 then that office was also abolished and replaced by the Victualling Department.

History

Under Elizabeth I, a General Surveyor of Victuals had been appointed in 1550 a principal officer of the Navy Board to oversee contracts for food and other provisions for the Navy. In 1550 he was listed as one of the seven members of the Board of Principal Officers and Commissioners of the Navy; he was required to 'take care always to have in store a stock of victuals to supply a thousand men at sea for one month at a fortnight's notice'. At first the Victualling Office was accommodated in the Tower of London, but it soon spread outside the precincts to the east (on to the site of the recently dissolved and demolished Abbey of St Mary Graces). The complex included storehouses, ovens, brewhouses and bakeries. (Milling took place across the river at Rotherhithe, and in 1650 a slaughterhouse was acquired in Deptford). Officials of the Victualling Board were to remain accommodated here until the nineteenth century; however, the constraints of the site (and difficult riverside access) led to the establishment of a new manufacturing facility at the Deptford site (the future Deptford Victualling Yard) in 1672.

By the mid-seventeenth century the established arrangement was for a single contractor to be engaged to make all necessary victualling provisions, with the Navy Board laying down strict criteria on the quality of the provisions it required. In the 1660s, Samuel Pepys, who was then Clerk of the Acts of the Navy, reformed the system of having a Purser assigned to each ship to oversee the distribution of supplies, and obliged each one to lodge a cash surety, and to keep complete accounts of every item issued. By the time of the Anglo-Dutch Wars, however, the system was breaking down (the government complaining that sufficient provisions had not been delivered, and the contractor complaining that payment had not been made). As a result of this, a salaried Board of Commissioners was established in 1683, and this body retained oversight of victualling for the next 150 years.

Though nominally under the direction of the Navy Board (which had its headquarters nearby on Tower Hill), the Victualling Board was effectively independent. The Victualling Board took over certain functions, including medical services, from the Transport Board on its dissolution in 1817. The Victualling Board itself was abolished in the Admiralty reforms of 1832, victualling then became the responsibility of the Comptroller of Victualling and Transports, who was superintended by the Fourth Sea Lord. In 1862 transport duties passed to a separate Transport Department and in 1869 the office of Comptroller of Victualling was abolished. His former duties were divided between the newly formed Contract and Purchase Department, under the Parliamentary and Financial Secretary, which became responsible for purchasing, management of the victualling stores facilities were under the control of the Superintendent of Victualling and the Victualling Department under the control of the  Director of Victualling.

Further activities

By 1739 the various Victualling Office facilities cost the state £16,241 to maintain, in addition to expenses for the purchase of victuals. In 1747, during the War of the Austrian Succession, this had risen to £30,393. In due course facilities were consolidated into Victualling Yards each with several processes and related storehouses accommodated on a single site. The Yards had deep-water wharves and were accessible (wind and weather permitting) from the major anchorages used by the Fleet. Under normal circumstances, ships due to set sail were expected to come to the nearest Yard to be loaded up with provisions. These would include preserved foodstuffs designed to last weeks or even months: ship's biscuit, salted beef, salted pork, pease, oatmeal, butter, cheese and beer. Most of these items were transported and stored in casks, which were themselves manufactured by the Board in large numbers at its on-site cooperages. In addition, the Victualling Yards provided fresh meat, bread and other items to ships stationed in port.

There was ongoing awareness of the need to stamp out corruption and improve quality. (In 1658 the crew of HMS Maidstone had demolished the Victualling Office at Rochester in protest at the foul quality of the food. Their captain Thomas Penrose refused to name any of the culprits.) The reason so much of the manufacturing process took place in-house was to guarantee a level of quality. It was far easier to gauge the quality of raw materials than it would have been to evaluate finished product bought in from other providers (some of whom were not so scrupulous). Therefore, the Commissioners oversaw not only supply, but manufacture: of beer from hops, of flour from grain, of meat from livestock.

Though by no means perfect the system generally improved; if the food was of poor quality, at least there was plenty of it. Modern research has shown that the sailor's diet during the mid-eighteenth century contained nearly twice as many calories per day than was available to men on shore or in the British Army. The single largest contributor of calories was beer, of which the Victualling Board purchased sufficient quantity that each sailor could consume a ration of one gallon per day. Food - principally bread, pork, beef, peas and oatmeal - was provided by the Board as stores for up to six months at a time. By the late 1750s this diet was supplemented with portable soup. The quality of food was also slowly improved; by the period of the Napoleonic Wars only about 1% of supplies were actually condemned as unfit to eat.

The Victualling Yards

Before 1815

By the early eighteenth century, Victualling Yards of various sizes had been established alongside several Royal Naval Dockyards in Britain, including Portsmouth, Plymouth, Deptford and Harwich (though the latter was closed, along with Harwich Dockyard, in 1713). There was also a Victualling Yard at Dover (which had no Dockyard, but was used to service ships in the nearby anchorage the Downs); the Maison Dieu served as Dover's victualling store from 1544 until 1831, when the Yard closed.

HM Victualling Yard, Deptford was the largest and busiest of the Victualling Yards (being advantageously close to the food wharves and markets of London).  The other Naval Dockyards in the Thames area (Chatham, Sheerness and Woolwich) were all dependent on Deptford for victualling. (The Commissioners did maintain a small Yard at Chatham but little or no manufacturing took place here, it was more a storage depot). Deptford also directly supplied a
Victualling Yard at Gibraltar (established in the eighteenth century).

In the first decade of the nineteenth century, the Commissioners established new minor Yards at Sheerness and at Deal (which, like Dover, provided for ships anchored in the Downs). In the following decade, a complex of naval and victualling storehouses was built on Haulbowline Island in Cork Harbour, Ireland (successor to an earlier depot at Kinsale). It was known as the Royal Alexandra Victualling Yard before being handed over to the Irish government in 1923.

Overseas victualling was, where possible, arranged through contracts with local suppliers. In some places these were overseen by a resident Agent appointed by the Victualling Commissioners (though in more out-of-the-way locations ships' captains were expected to make their own arrangements). In the 17th century there were Agent Victuallers in Leghorn and Tangiers, as well as at a range of ports at home; by 1810 they were in such diverse locations as Malta, Rio de Janeiro, the Cape and Heligoland. For maximum flexibility, any necessary buildings were for the most part rented, rather than purpose-built; (although, in the 18th century, Yards were established on Jamaica and Antigua, these did not prove durable). On Gibraltar, however, a Victualling Yard was built in 1799 (following the loss of a rented property), and remained in operation until the 1980s.

1815-1900

The Victualling Yards in Britain had for the most part developed haphazardly over time. In 1822, however, the Victualling Board decided to rationalise its Plymouth operation in a new, centralised site at Stonehouse which was named the Royal William Victualling Yard. It consisted of a central Grand Storehouse, flanked by two sizeable manufactories alongside the waterfront: a mill/bakery on one side, a brewery on the other (providing biscuits and beer respectively). The other buildings on site include cooperages (for manufacturing barrels), officers' residences and an elegant Slaughterhouse (for provision of salted beef), all in matching limestone and arranged on a symmetrical grid layout.

A similar approach was taken with regard to Portsmouth: there, the new Royal Clarence Victualling Yard was begun in 1827 (on a site in Gosport known as the Weevil yard, where the Commissioners already owned a brewery and cooperage established in the early eighteenth century). Here the layout was less regimented, as the old cooperage was incorporated into the new complex; but it still presented an impressive frontage to the dockside (the symmetry of which has recently been restored through the rebuilding of a wing to the Granary, which had been demolished after the war). Royal Clarence was one of the first large industrial food processing plants in the country. Here, as at Royal William, many key buildings have survived in situ (though for the most part their function changed over decades of use): in addition to the 18th-century cooperage yard with its pump house, there is the monumental granary and bakery complex, a detached slaughterhouse, remains of the brewery storehouse (which also dates from the 18th century), a self-contained workshop complex, and officers' houses flanking the gateway arch. There is also an unusual building designed for storing and maintaining up to 3,000 cast iron ships' water tanks; a nearby reservoir (which also powered hydraulic machinery in the yard) was used to replenish HM Ships with fresh water.

Both the 'William' and the 'Clarence' yards were named after the future King William IV, who had taken an active interest in developments. Each was designed to maximize efficient storage, manufacture and seafront delivery of provisions, whilst also presenting a strikingly monumental symmetrical frontage to the sea. The Royal William Yard, in particular, has been described as "a unique concept in English industrial history: as a planned state manufacturing complex, on such a lavish scale, it is without comparison".

Deptford's Yard was not comprehensively rebuilt in this way, but it did continue to grow, even after the adjacent Dockyard had closed. (At its greatest extent, the site covered 35 acres.) During the 19th century, Deptford in particular began to stock or manufacture more specialised foodstuffs, in addition to the more traditional fare: there were cocoa, pepper and mustard mills on the site, along with storehouses for tea, sugar, rice, raisins and wine, as well as tobacco. In 1858, Deptford was renamed the Royal Victoria Victualling Yard.

Overseas, Yards and Storehouses continued to be established at different times when or where circumstances required; for example, at Georgetown on the remote settlement of Ascension Island a victualling storehouse was in place by 1827, later to be joined by a bakery (a rare instance of manufacturing in an overseas Yard) and a set of tanks for collecting and storing fresh water. In 1845, a Victualling Yard was built at Malta Dockyard; the Malta Maritime Museum is housed in one of its former buildings (the mill/bakery - of a monumental character similar to that of the Royal William Yard in Plymouth). At around the same time, work was beginning on the dockyard complex in Bermuda. Here, a spacious victualling yard was laid out between the dockyard proper and the fortified ordnance yard; still standing today, it consists of two long storehouses facing each other across an open quadrangle, the other two sides being formed by a cooperage and a row of officers' houses. The yard was eventually completed in around 1860.

1900-present

New Victualling Yards were still being established in the early 20th century, both at home (e.g. the Royal Elizabeth Yard, Dalmeny: a minor yard built to serve the new Dockyard at Rosyth) and abroad (e.g. the Royal Edward Yard, Darling Island, Sydney Harbour, Australia: built by the Government of New South Wales). Indeed, provisioning methods remained substantially unchanged until more widespread use of tinned foods, and then refrigeration, were adopted later in the century. At Gosport, the cooperage remained operational until 1970, when its work ceased along with the rum ration.

Deptford's Royal Victoria yard remained open until 1961, after which a housing estate was built on the site (though some buildings/features were retained and converted for community use). The South Coast yards - the Royal Clarence and the Royal William - both closed in 1992; since then, both sites have been sold to the private sector and their buildings (most of which are listed) have been converted to residential, office and leisure uses.

Administration and structure of the Board
On the Board, each Commissioner had responsibility for a key area of victualling activity: the Brewhouse department,, the  Cutting House department, the Dry Goods department, Cooperage, Hoytaking and Stores. There were seven Commissioners; the aforementioned six, plus the Chairman (who had direct oversight of the Cash department). The Victualling Board proceeded to build breweries, slaughterhouses, mills and bakeries near to the Royal Navy Dockyards to provide beer, salted meat, ship's biscuits and other supplies under its own quality control. In 1725, the Victualling Commissioners, the Navy Board, the Sick and Hurt Commissioners and the Navy Pay Office all of which were components of the Navy Office moved into new accommodation in Somerset House.

Principal Officers and Commissioners of the Victualling Board
Included:

Comptroller of Victualling and Chairman of the Victualling Board
 1803-1808 Captain. John Marsh
 1808-1821 Captain, Thomas Welsh
 1821-1822 Captain, John Clarke Searle
 1822-1832 Hon. Granville Anson Chetwynd Stapylton

Deputy Chairman of the Victualling Board
 1803-1822, Captain, George Philips Towry
 1822-1823, Captain, Hon. Courtenay Boyle
 1823-1832, John Wolley

Additional Comptrollers of the Victualling Board
 Comptroller of the Brew House
 Comptroller of the Cutting House
 Comptroller of Dry Goods
 Comptroller of Copperage
 Comptroller of Hoytaking
 Comptroller of Victualling Stores

Victualling Commissioners
Included:
 1683-1690. Nicholas Fenn
 1683—1690. Sir Richard Haddock
 1683-1690. John Parsons
 1683-1690. Anthony Sturt
 1690-1693. James How
 1690-1699. John Agar
 1690-1699 Humphrey Ayles
 1690-1702. Thomas Papillon
 1690-1702 Simon Mayne
 1693-1695. Israel Fielding
 1695-1702 John Burrington
 1699-1711 Thomas Colby
 1699-1711. Henry Vincent
 1702 Sir JJohn Houblon Kt.
 1702 William Carpenter
 1702-1703 William Wright
 1702-1704 John James
 1702-1706 Abraham Tilghman
 1703-1705 Thomas Jennings
 1704-1706 Samuel Hunter
 1704-1706 Henry Lee
 1704-1714 Kenrick Edisbury
 1705-1711 Thomas Harlow
 1706-1711 Denzil Onslow
 1706-1711 Thomas Reynolds
 1706-1725 Thomas Bere
 1711-1714 Henry Lee
 1711-1714 Sir Francis Marsham 3rd Bart
 1711-1718 Henry Vincent
 1711-1721 Samuel Hunter
 1712-1714 William Stephens
 1714-1717 Waller Bacon
 1714-1719 Robert Arris
 1714-1721 Denzil Onslow
 1714-1721 Thomas Reynolds
 1714-1723 Peter Jeyes
 1717-1720 Owen Buckingham
 1718-1720 Edward Eliot
 1719-1728 William Passenger
 1720-1721 Joshua Churchill
 1720-1727 Henry Cartwright
 1721-1722 Hugh Cholmley
 1721-1727 Sir George Saunders Kt.
 1721-1734 William Fisher
 1722-1727 Stephen Bisse
 1725-1729 George Huxley
 1725-1733 Edward Trelawny
 1727-1728 Sprig Manesty
 1727-1739 Henry Parsons
 1728-1734 John Berkeley
 1728-1747 Thomas Revell
 1729-1744 William Thompson
 1729-1747 Thomas Brereton
 1733-1738 George Crowle
 1734-1742 Francis Eyles (later Eyles Stiles)
 1734-1746 Stephen Bisse
 1738-1748 William Hay
 1741-1744 Thomas Trefusis
 1742 -1752 Richard Hall
 1742-1755 Thomas Cooper
 1744-1748 William Davies
 1745-1746 Arthur Stert
 1746-1747 John Russell
 1746-1778 James Wallace
 1747-1760 William Jenkins
 1747-1761 Francis Vernon
 1747-1762 Sir Francis Haskins Eyles-Stiles, 3rd Bart
 1747-1765 Hon. Horatio Townshend
 1748-1752 Tyrwhitt Cayley
 1752 Thomas Winterbottom
 1752-1780 Sir Roger Burgoyne (Bart)
 1755-1776 Robert Pett
 1760-1763 Robert Rule
 1761-1768 Tyringham Stephens
 1762-1784 Jonas Hanway
 1763-1772 George Marsh
 1765-1767 James Fortrey
 1767-1794 Alexander Chorley
 1768-1780 Thomas Colby
 1772-1776 William Gordon
 1776-1778 Henry Pelham
 1776-1785 Joah Bates
 1778-1787 James Kirke
 1778-1789 John Slade
 1781-1786 Montagu Burgoyne
 1781-1790 William Lance
 1784-1803 George Phillips Towry
 1785-1799 George Cherry
 1785-1811 William Boscawen
 1787-1793 Samuel Marshall
 1789-1790 William Bellingham
 1790-1798 Joseph Hunt
 1790-1805 Francis Stephens
 1793-1796 Francis John Hartwell
 1794-1809 Sadleir Mood
 1796-1803 John Rodney
 1798-1803 John Marsh
 1799-1807 John Harrison
 1803-1806 Rear-Admiral, Charles Cunningham
 1805-1808 William Budge
 1807-1822 Thomas Welsh
 1808-1822 John Aubin
 1808-1831 Nicholas Brown
 1809-1813 Hon. Edward Richard Stewart
 1811-1832 Frederick Edgcumbe
 1813-1825 Robert William Hay
 1817-1831 John Weir
 1821-1827 Richard Creyke
 1821-1832 Henry Garrett
 1822-1832 Sir William Burnett Kt. (ktd. 25 May 1831)
 1825-1829 Hon. William Lennox Bathurst
 1827-1832 Captain, Sir James Alexander Gordon Kt.
 1827-1832 Captain, John Hill
 1831-1832 John Thomas Briggs
 1839-1832 James Meek.

Timeline
Note: Below is a timeline of responsibility for victualling for the Royal Navy.
 Navy Board, Surveyor of Marine Victuals, 1550-1679
 Navy Board, Victualling Board (Board of Victualling Commissioners), 1683-1832
 Board of Admiralty, Comptroller of Victualling and Transport Services, 1832-1862
 Board of Admiralty, Comptroller of Victualling, 1862-1870
 Board of Admiralty, Contract and Purchase Department, 1869-1964
 Board of Admiralty, Superintendent of Victualling, 1870-1878
 Board of Admiralty, Director of Victualling, 1878-1964

See also
 Sir William Bellingham, 1st Baronet

Notes

References

Attribution
 Archives. National. (1660-1975). Records of Victualling Departments. ADM Division 9. http://discovery.nationalarchives.gov.uk/details/r/C708/Records of Victualling Departments

Further reading

External links
 Video footage of the last coopers working at Royal Clarence Yard in 1970

Royal Navy
Royal Navy appointments
History of the Royal Navy
1832 disestablishments